Taxes in India are levied by the Central Government and the State Governments by virtue of powers conferred to them from the Constitution of India. Some minor taxes are also levied by the local authorities such as the Municipality.

The authority to levy a tax is derived from the Constitution of India which allocates the power to levy various taxes between the Union Government and the State Governments. An important restriction on this power is Article 265 of the Constitution which states that "No tax shall be levied or collected except by the authority of law". Therefore, each tax levied or collected has to be backed by an accompanying law, passed either by the Parliament or the State Legislature. Nonetheless, tax evasion is a massive problem in India, ultimately catalyzing various negative effects on the country.

History
India has abolished multiple taxes with passage of time and imposed new ones. A few of these taxes include inheritance tax, interest tax, gift tax, wealth tax, etc. Wealth Tax Act, 1957 was repealed in the year 2015.
Direct Taxes in India were governed by two major legislations, Income Tax Act, 1961 and Wealth Tax Act, 1957. A new legislation, Direct Taxes Code (DTC), was proposed to replace the two acts. However, the Wealth Tax Act was repealed in 2015 and the idea of DTC was dropped.

Constitutionally established scheme of taxation
Article 246 of the Indian Constitution, distributes legislative powers including taxation, between the Parliament of India and the State Legislature. Schedule VII enumerates these subject matters with the use of three lists:
 List - I entailing the areas on which only the parliament is competent to make laws,
 List - II entailing the areas on which only the state legislature can make laws, and
 List - III listing the areas on which both the Parliament and the State Legislature can make laws upon concurrently.

Separate heads of taxation are no head of taxation in the Concurrent List (Union and the States have no concurrent power of taxation). The list of thirteen Union heads of taxation and the list of nineteen State heads are given below:

Central government of India

State governments

Income tax

Income Tax is a tax imposed on individuals or entities (taxpayers) that varies with respective income or profits (taxable income). Income tax generally is computed as the product of a tax rate times taxable income. However, for individuals, tax is payable at slab rates. In the Finance Act, 2020 the Government introduced a new tax regime for individuals giving them the option to opt for the new regime or continue with the old regime.

The tax is collected by the Income Tax Department for the central government. Farmers - who constitute 70% of the Indian workforce - are generally excluded from paying income tax in India. 

Income tax returns are due in India generally on 31 July, 30 September or 30 November, depending on the category of taxpayer. Everyone who earns or gets an income in India is subject to income tax. Income is divided into five categories: Income from Salary, Income from Other Sources, Income from House Property, Income from Capital Gains, and Income from Business and Profession.

Goods and services tax

Goods and Services Tax is an indirect tax collected on supply of goods or service.
 Central Goods and Services Tax (CGST): Portion of Tax to central government on intrastate sales.
 State Goods and Services Tax (SGST): Portion of Tax to state on intrastate sales.
 Integrated Goods and Services Tax (IGST): tax for interstate sales.

Goods and services are divided into five different tax slabs for collection of tax - 0%, 5%, 12%, 18% and 28%. However, petroleum products, alcoholic drinks, and electricity are not taxed under GST and instead are taxed separately by the individual state governments, as per the previous tax system.

Custom duty
Customs duty is a tax on import & export of goods in India with specific rates on certain types of goods. Customs authorities are rightful in checking accurate details of the items exported or imported along with the origin of the item and duly validated rates & structure.
Custom duty measures the value of the items in the context of the tax applicable on such item and is much higher on certain types of items including sin goods i.e. liquor & imported cigars.

Custom duty is an indirect tax levied on import or export of goods in and out of country. When goods are imported from outside, the tax known as import custom duty. when goods are exported outside India, the tax is known as export custom duty. The tax collected by Central Board of Indirect Taxes and Customs. In February 2020, as part of India's attempts to increase and support local production, the government stated that it raised taxes on imports for items such as electronic devices, furniture and toys.

Service tax

Service tax is imposed by the government on all the services provided by firms and servicing companies in lieu of monetary benefit. The service tax levied on services is actually borne by the customers which in turn goes through multiple channels of levying authorities till back to the government. Service tax will be applicable on the taxable services only which is provided or will be provided by the service provider agreeing upon the concern of actually offering services.

It is a tax levied on services provided in India.  The responsibility of collecting the tax lies with the Central Board of Excise and Customs (CBEC). From 2012, service tax is imposed on all services, except those which are specifically exempted under law(e.g. Exempt under Negative List, Exempt as exclusion from Service definition as per Service Tax, Exempt under MEN(Mega exemption notification)). In budget presented for 2008–2009, it was announced that all small service providers whose turnover does not exceed  need not pay service tax. Service tax at a rate of 14 percent(Inclusive of EC & SHEC) will be imposed on all applicable services from 1 June 2015. From 15 November 2015, Swacch Bharat cess of 0.5% has been added to all taxable service leading the new Service Tax rate to be 14.5 percent (Inclusive of EC, SHEC & Swacch Bharat cess). On 29 February 2016, Current Finance Minister Mr. Arun Jaitley announces a new Cess, Krishi Kalyan Cess that would be levied from 1 June 2016 at the rate of 0.5% on all taxable services. The purpose of introducing Krishi Kalyan Cess is to improve agriculture activities and welfare of Indian farmers. Thus, the new Service Tax rate would be 15% incorporating EC, SHEC, Swachh Bharat Cess and Krishi Kalyan Cess.

Service tax has been replaced by Goods and Services Tax in India. Service tax no longer applies to services in India.

Central excise

 Central Excise Act, 1944, which imposes a duty of excise on goods manufactured or produced in India;
 Central Sales Tax, 1956, which imposes sales tax on goods sold in inter-state trade or commerce in Indisale of property situated within the state

In the 2016 Union budget of India, an excise of duty of 1% without input tax credit and 12.5% with input tax credit was imposed on articles of jewellery with the exception of silver jewellery. The government had earlier proposed an excise duty in the Budget 2011–12, which had to be rolled back after massive protests by jewellers.
 Central Excise Tariff Act, 1985
 Central Excise Valuation (Determination of Price of Excisable Goods) Rules, 2000

Local body taxes

"Local body tax", popularly known by its abbreviation as "LBT", is the tax imposed by the local civic bodies of India on the entry of goods into a local area for consumption, use or sale therein. The tax is imposed based on the Entry 52 of the State List from the Schedule VII of the Constitution of India which reads; "Taxes on the entry of goods into a local area for consumption, use or sale therein." The tax is to be paid by the trader to the civic bodies and the rules and regulations of these vary amongst different States in India. The LBT is now partially abolished as of 1 August 2015.

Property tax
Property tax, or 'house tax,' is a local tax on buildings, along with appurtenant land, and imposed on Possessor (certainly, not true custodian of property as per 1978, 44th amendment of constitution). It resembles the US-type wealth tax and differs from the excise-type UK rate. The tax power is vested in the states and it is delegated by law to the local bodies, specifying the valuation method, rate band, and collection procedures. The tax base is the annual rental value (ARV) or area-based rating. Owner-occupied and other properties not producing rent are assessed on cost and then converted into ARV by applying a percentage of cost, usually six percent. Vacant land is generally exempt. Central government properties are exempt. Instead a 'service charge' is permissible under executive order. Properties of foreign missions also enjoy tax exemption without an insistence for reciprocity. The tax is usually accompanied by a number of service taxes, e.g., water tax, drainage tax, conservancy (sanitation) tax, lighting tax, all using the same tax base. The rate structure is flat on rural (panchayat) properties, but in the urban (municipal) areas it is mildly progressive with about 80% of assessments falling in the first two slabs.

Tax evasion 

The Indian government's deficiency in governmental expenditures is most notably attributed to wide spread tax evasion. Relative to other developing countries, the fact that India's income tax comprises 5% of its GDP is due to the fact nearly 2-3% of the population is exposed to income taxation. India faces more difficulties in proliferating its income tax than a country like China, who subjects 20% of its population, because there is an emphatically low amount of formal wage earners. Even though India's income tax was instituted in 1922 by the British, their tax history explains their high degree of tax delinquency today. With effect from 1 April 2017, the Income-tax Act, 1961 has introduced the General Anti-avoidance Rules. The intent of the bringing the said rules is to curb the ill-practices of the tax payers & tax practitioners assisting the tax payers in avoiding the tax where the tax impact of the arrangement or the transactions is more than INR Three Crores in a particular Financial Year. GAAR intends to cover the cases where the main purpose of the transaction is to obtain the tax benefit. It is pertinent to note that recently due to BEPS project by OECD & G 20 Member nations, there was huge hue and cry by the Inclusive Framework countries, where every country were trying to protect their respective tax base. Accordingly, basis the Action Plan Report 6 of the BEPS Project, member nations were required to adopt PPT test as a minimum standard. The said standard re-enshrines that where " one of the principal purpose of the transaction is to obtain tax benefit" then treaty benefit will not be allowed. Thus, presently in Indian context most of the treaties entered into by India, includes such minimum standard, accordingly where one of the principal purpose of the transaction is to obtain tax benefit, treaty benefit will be denied. This has posed several difficulties for MNCs who have routed their investments through Island Countries in India such as Mauritius, which though has a very good- Double tax avoidance treaty with India but with PPT all the benefits could be questioned due to want of Substance & PPT test requirements. The same was considered recently by Authority for Advance Rulings, New Delhi in ruling for Tiger Global International II Holdings,

History and methods:

In the beginning of the income tax operation, the rates of taxes were comparatively low to levels today, and thus, so were levels of evasion. However, World War Two catalyzed a set of conditions that inspired mass tax evasion. As many supplies were cut off and shortages were rampant, the prices of commodities and the level of taxes imposed by the government augmented. This ultimately generated black markets, and stimulated a nationwide sentiment of tax evasion. Consequently, as the government tried to combat this extensive issue, the government continued to impose extortionate levels of taxation, only exacerbating the normalcy of tax evasion. Today, opportunities for tax evasion are comprehensive amongst self-employed individuals, as they have more opportunities to lie about the origination of their income. For instance, many individuals exaggerate or lie about their wealth deriving from agriculture, because agricultural income is excluded from the purview of the central income tax. In addition, many individuals divert their incomes to spouses and children, or even create fictitious partnerships, in order to evade taxation. The general consensus asserts the following to be chiefly responsible for increasing tax evasion and generation of black money in India:
 Complicated tax structure
 Frequent amendments
 Shortage of personnel
 High tax rates
 Non-levy of deterrent penalties
 Ineffective prosecution machinery
 Operation of ill- thought-out controls
 Price fixation without proper regulation of production and distribution
 Evasion of sales tax
 Excise duty

 
Additionally, enormous amounts of black income and tax evasion are fueled by bribery and corruption. In India, corrupt businessmen sponsor political parties with black money, in order to augment their wealth reduce their taxation. Inherently then, the lack of revenue for governmental expenditures is partly created by the government themselves. While individuals blame the government for difficulties and shortages, many do not understand the importance of taking accountability and paying one's taxes.

Effects of mass tax evasion:

The exorbitant levels of tax evasion has inspired the creation of a black money parallel economy. Black money inherently causes inflation and hinders the government's ability to bring down the prices of commodities. In fact, the large volume of black money actually diverts governmental resources from national welfare and encourages the continuation of illegal activity. Unfortunately, it is the honest individuals who are in the salaried class who feel the negative externalities of this situation. Besides depriving the state's exchequer and understating India's GDP, extensive tax evasion has encouraged the payment of huge dowries at the time of marriages. This ultimately makes it difficult for low and middle class individuals to marry off their children, adding a social detriment to this widespread economic problem. More than anything though, the normalcy of tax evasion has understated positive societal values like honesty and hard work.

Governmental attempts to combat tax evasion:

The Indian government has taken several steps in order to mitigate the effects and degree of tax evasion. Amongst actual legislations, Searches, seizures, surveys, and scrutiny of income tax returns are being done by the Income Tax Department. The government has also created Voluntary Disclosure of Income Schemes, whereby black income and assets can actually be declared without penalty or prosecution. In addition, the introduction of the Prevention of Money‐Laundering Act makes any and all activities related to the laundering of money a federal offense with a minimum imprisonment of less than three years. Similarly, the Finance Act of 2004 prosecutes for the falsification of books and taxing gifts worth more than 25,000 Rupees. Given that tax evasion is one of the most wide spread, yet difficult issues a government can deal with, they have historically relegated this issue to recommendations made by Taxation Enquiry Commission (1953), Administrative Reforms Commission (1969), and  Direct Tax Enquiry Committee (1971). Additionally, India has attempted to eradicate tax evasion by requiring an identification number for all major financial deals. However, this method has proven very ineffective, as many transactions are conducted with cash and therefore often go unreported.

See also
 History of the British salt tax in India
 Indian tax forms
 Investigation Division of the Central Board of Direct Taxes
 Directorate of Revenue Intelligence
 States of India by tax revenues
Taxation in medieval India
 Union budget of India
 Value-added taxation in India
 Chairperson, Central Board of Direct Taxes
 Chairperson, Central Board of Indirect Taxes and Customs

References

.

External links 

 Union budget and Economic Survey
 Department of Public Expenditure and Reform
 Indian Income Tax Department
 Electronic Filing of Income Tax returns